Ukkusissat Heliport  is a heliport in Ukkusissat, a village in the Uummannaq Fjord system in the Avannaata municipality in northwestern Greenland. The heliport is considered a helistop, and is served by Air Greenland as part of a government contract. There are no facilities at the helistop; check-in is administered in the Pilersuisoq communal store, the central point of the settlement.

On the way from Uummannaq Heliport, Air Greenland helicopters fly alongside the southern and western wall of Appat Island, to then pass above the narrow Appat Ikerat strait between Appat and the smaller Salleq Island, a high, standalone flooded mountain.

Airlines and destinations

Air Greenland operates government contract flights to villages in the Uummannaq Fjord area. These mostly cargo flights are not featured in the timetable, although they can be pre-booked. Departure times for these flights as specified during booking are by definition approximate, with the settlement service optimized on the fly depending on local demand for a given day.

Photographs

References

Airports in the Arctic
Heliports in Greenland
Uummannaq Fjord